The 2003–04 season saw Preston North End compete in the Football League First Division where they finished in 15th position with 59 points.

Final league table

Results
Preston North End's score comes first

Legend

Football League First Division

FA Cup

Football League Cup

Squad statistics

References

External links
 Preston North End 2003–04 at Soccerbase.com (select relevant season from dropdown list)

Preston North End F.C. seasons
Preston North End